Richard Edward Connell Sr. (November 6, 1857 – October 30, 1912) was an American newspaperman and politician who served one term as a United States representative from New York from March 4, 1911 until his death on October 30, 1912.

Early life
Connell was born in Poughkeepsie, Dutchess County, New York to Richard and Ann Connell (née Phelan) who had immigrated to New York from Kilkenny, Ireland in 1846. Connell, a Catholic, attended St. Peter's parochial school and the public schools of Poughkeepsie until he was 13 years old when he dropped out and entered the workforce to support his siblings and widowed mother. He worked various odd jobs including for the Poughkeepsie and Eastern Railway and Hudson River State Hospital. He was eventually hired as a reporter for the Poughkeepsie News-Press before rising to managing editor.

Political career
Connell first rose to local political prominence in 1884 when he began giving speeches in support of presidential candidate Grover Cleveland. He was a perennially unsuccessful candidate in the 19th century. He failed to be elected over John H. Ketcham to the 55th United States Congress in 1896 or to the New York State Assembly in 1898 and 1900. After repeated failures, Connell attempted to curry favor with schoolchildren in the hopes that they would vote for him when they came of age.

Between his campaigns, Connell served as police commissioner of Poughkeepsie for three years beginning in 1892, Dutchess County's inheritance tax appraiser from 1907 to 1909 and delegate to the Democratic National Convention in 1900 and 1904.

In 1910, Connell and Hyde Park resident Franklin D. Roosevelt embarked on a joint campaign in the Hudson Valley in Roosevelt's Maxwell automobile; Connell was running for the U.S. House of Representatives and Roosevelt for the New York State Senate. From Connell, Roosevelt would borrow the opening phrase with which he would begin many speeches for the rest of his career: "My friends." Connell defeated the incumbent, Republican Hamilton Fish II, by 517 votes to win election to the 62nd United States Congress.

In his brief time in Congress, Connell collaborated with Representative Isaac R. Sherwood in championing a successful Civil War veterans' pension bill. He had been nominated in 1912 as the Democratic candidate for reelection to the 63rd United States Congress.

Personal life and death

Connell and his wife Mary (née Miller) had four children, Mary, Anne, Catherine and Richard. The younger Richard, who was his father's secretary during sessions of Congress, would go on to become an accomplished writer best known for his short story "The Most Dangerous Game."

Connell was a member of the Royal Arcanum, Knights of Columbus and Order of Elks.

Connell spent the night of October 29, 1912 making speeches in Putnam County and returned home to Poughkeepsie around 2:00 a.m. When he did not get out of bed the following morning for an 8:00 a.m. car which was hired to bring him to meet constituents in Middletown, his wife found him unresponsive. He had died in his sleep of heart disease.

He is buried in St. Peter's Cemetery in Poughkeepsie.

See also
List of United States Congress members who died in office (1900–49)

References

External links
 
 Richard E. Connell, late a representative from New York, Memorial addresses delivered in the House of Representatives and Senate frontispiece 1914

1857 births
1912 deaths
19th-century American politicians
20th-century American politicians
American people of Irish descent
Democratic Party members of the United States House of Representatives from New York (state)
Politicians from Poughkeepsie, New York
Burials in New York (state)
Catholics from New York (state)
Members of the Benevolent and Protective Order of Elks